Archie Taylor (1869 – 16 June 1939) was a British sports shooter. He competed in the stationary target small-bore rifle event at the 1908 Summer Olympics.

References

1869 births
1939 deaths
British male sport shooters
Olympic shooters of Great Britain
Shooters at the 1908 Summer Olympics
Place of birth missing